Dale is a hamlet in Wyoming County, New York, United States. Dale has a post office with ZIP code 14039, which opened on October 26, 1838.

References

Hamlets in Wyoming County, New York
Hamlets in New York (state)